Jaime Carlos Diaz de Veyra (November 4, 1873 – March 7, 1963) was a Resident Commissioner to the U.S. House of Representatives from the Philippine Islands from 1917 to 1923 and the 1st Governor of Leyte from 1906 to 1907.

Early life
He was born on November 4, 1873, in the town of Tanauan in Leyte province.

Education 
De Veyra attended both public and private schools. In 1888, he began studying at Colegio de San Juan de Letran in Manila, and graduated in 1893 with a Bachelor of Arts. In 1895, he began studying for a Bachelor of Law and a Bachelor of Philosophy and Letters at the University of Santo Tomas in Manila. He completed both degrees in 1898.

Political career
From 1888 to 1899 he served as secretary to the Military Governor of Leyte, General Ambrosio Moxica.

In 1901 he was elected municipal councilor in the town of Cebu, and became municipal vice-president the following year. In 1903, he became president of the electoral assembly of Cebu. In 1904, de Veyra became Director of Liceo de Maasim, in Leyte, and served until 1905.

In 1905, he became an editor for the Spanish-Tagalog language newspaper El Renacimiento.

In 1906, de Veyra became Governor of Leyte, He served until 1907, when he became a member of the first Philippine Assembly as the first representative of Leyte's Fourth District in the Philippine House of Representatives. He served in the Assembly until 1913, when he became a member of the Philippine Commission 1913–1916.

In 1916, de Veyra was appointed executive secretary of the Philippine Islands under Governor-General Francis Burton Harrison, and served until 1917.

In 1917, de Veyra was elected to the U.S. House of Representatives as a Resident Commissioner of the Philippines. He reelected in 1920 and served from March 4, 1917, to March 3, 1923. He was declined to be a candidate for renomination in 1922.

He engaged in journalistic work during 1923 he became head of the department of Spanish, University of the Philippines at Manila, 1925–1936. From 1937 to 1944. de Veyra was the director of the Institute of National Language. He also served as historical researcher in charge of manuscripts and publications, National Library and historical researcher, Office of the President, 1946.

Personal life
Jaime de Veyra married clubwoman and suffragette Sofia Reyes in 1907. They had four children, Their son Manuel E. de Veyra was a doctor during World War II serving at Bataan. Their son Jesus de Veyra became a judge, and dean of the Ateneo Law School from 1976 to 1981.

Sofia Reyes de Veyra died in 1953, aged 77 years old. Jaime de Veyra died in Manila, Philippines on March 7, 1963. He was buried at La Loma Cemetery in Caloocan.

See also
Commission on the Filipino Language
List of Asian Americans and Pacific Islands Americans in the United States Congress
Resident Commissioner of the Philippines

References

External links

|-

|-

1873 births
1963 deaths
Chairpersons of the Commission on the Filipino Language
Colegio de San Juan de Letran alumni
Filipino educators
20th-century Filipino historians
20th-century Filipino lawyers
Linguists from the Philippines
Governors of Leyte (province)
Members of the House of Representatives of the Philippines from Leyte (province)
Members of the United States Congress of Filipino descent
People from Leyte (province)
Spanish-language writers of the Philippines
Resident Commissioners of the Philippines
Quezon administration personnel
University of Santo Tomas alumni
Visayan people
Members of the Philippine Legislature
Recipients of the Presidential Medal of Merit (Philippines)